Carlia spinauris is a species of skink in the genus Carlia. It is native to Indonesia.

References

Carlia
Reptiles described in 1927
Endemic fauna of Indonesia
Reptiles of Indonesia
Taxa named by Malcolm Arthur Smith